Sachtler is a manufacturer of film and video camera support products and reporter lighting equipment. The company was founded in 1958 and was bought by the United Kingdom's Vitec Group (now Videndum) in 1995.

History
Wendelin Sachtler was a cinematographer, actor and inventor, living in South-Germany. In 1958 he designed the first tripod head. This so-called gyroscopic head provided not only pans and tilt motion, but also added gyroscopic damping to smooth out camera moves. The new tripod head proved so popular with fellow camera operators  that it led to the foundation of a new company, Sachtler, to meet demand. He worked out of a small workshop in Munich-Schwabing, Germany. After a pair of moves, since 2004 Sachtler GmbH has been located in Eching near Munich. Sachtler has 150 employees worldwide and is represented by retailers in more than 140 countries. The company has production facilities in Germany, Costa Rica and Great Britain.

In 1992 the company was awarded the "Scientific and Engineering Award", an award set up by the Academy of Motion Picture Arts and Sciences.

In 1995 Sachtler was acquired by the Vitec Group PLC.

In 2001 Sachtler and Curt O. Schaller launched the artemis camera stabilizer system at the NAB Show in Las Vegas. The artemis systems were the first modular camera stabilizer systems in the world. In addition, the artemis HD systems were the first Full HD camera stabilizer systems worldwide.

The artemis Trinity system, developed by Curt O. Schaller together with Roman Foltyn in 2015, is the first camera stabilizer system in the world that combines a mechanical stabilization system with an electronic one.

In April 2016, ARRI acquired the artemis camera stabilizer systems developed by Curt O. Schaller from Sachtler / Vitec Videocom.

Products

The company's portfolio can be divided into: 
 Camera support
 High quality bags for storage and transportation of professional broadcast, camera and audio equipment

The camera support division includes the production of Sachtler fluid heads, tripods and pedestals and professional bags for cameramen and sound operators.

References

External links
Sachtler
Vitec Group

Photography companies of Germany
Companies based in Upper Bavaria
German brands